The Gold Rush Classic was a golf tournament on the Champions Tour from 1987 to 2001. It was played in Rancho Murieta, California at the Rancho Murieta Country Club (1987–1995) and in El Dorado Hills, California at Serrano Country Club (1996–2001).

The purse for the 2001 tournament was US$1,300,000, with $195,000 going to the winner. The tournament was founded in 1987 as the Rancho Murieta Senior Gold Rush.

Winners
Gold Rush Classic
2001 Tom Kite
2000 Jim Thorpe

Raley's Gold Rush Classic
1999 David Graham
1998 Dana Quigley
1997 Bob Eastwood
1996 Jim Colbert

Raley's Senior Gold Rush
1995 Don Bies
1994 Bob Murphy
1993 George Archer
1992 Bob Charles
1991 George Archer

Rancho Murieta Senior Gold Rush
1990 George Archer
1989 Dave Hill
1988 Bob Charles
1987 Orville Moody

Source:

References

Former PGA Tour Champions events
Golf in California
Recurring sporting events established in 1987
Recurring sporting events disestablished in 2001
1987 establishments in California
2001 disestablishments in California